Robert Astrem (or Robert Aström; 24 January 1887 Narva – 8 February 1941 Tallinn) was an Estonian politician. He was a member of Estonian Constituent Assembly, representing the Estonian Social Democratic Workers' Party. On 23 April 1920, he resigned his post and he was replaced by Gustav Küjen.

References

1887 births
1941 deaths
Politicians from Narva
People from Yamburgsky Uyezd
Estonian Social Democratic Workers' Party politicians
Members of the Estonian Constituent Assembly
Members of the Riigikogu, 1920–1923